The National Archives of Mongolia are the national archives of Mongolia. It is based in Ulaanbaatar, and was established in 1927.

See also 
 List of national archives

References

External links 
 https://www.archives.gov.mn

The English language version of the website is https://www.archives.gov.mn/duk/

Mongolia